Louise Carver (June 9, 1869 - June 19, 1956) was an American actress who performed in grand opera, stage, nickelodeon, and motion pictures.

Early years and career
Born Mary Louise Steiger in Davenport, Iowa, she was the daughter of Mr. and Mrs. Fritz Stieger.

Carver made her first appearance on stage as a teenager, and her grand opera debut came at the Auditorium Theatre, Chicago, Illinois in 1892. In 1908, she made her screen debut in Macbeth. She came to national prominence as a comedian in Mack Sennett silent films such as The Hollywood Kid (1924). One of her bigger roles on stage was as the leading lady of Lew Fields in Mrs. Henpecks, which played on Broadway for months in 1912–1913. Her final screen credits are from 1941. This year, she made Love at First Fright and had uncredited roles in Tight Shoes and Some More of Samoa.

Personal life and death

She married Tom Murray in 1935 becoming (Mary) Louise Steiger Murray.

On January 19, 1956, Carver died at her home in Los Angeles, California, aged 87. Her funeral was conducted at Hollywood Chapel and she was buried in Chapel of the Pines Crematory.

Partial filmography

 Macbeth (1908, Short) - Lady Macbeth
 Romeo and Juliet (1908, Short) - Nurse
 Court House Crooks (1915, Short)
 Somewhere in Turkey (1918, Short)
 Main Street (1923) - Mrs. Donovan
 Scaramouche (1923) - Member of Theatre Audience (uncredited)
 The Extra Girl (1923) - Madame McCarthy - Wardrobe Mistress
 The Cat's Meow (1924, Short) - Anti-Slum Committee Woman
 Fight and Win (1924)
 Breed of the Border (1924) - Ma Malone
 Seven Chances (1925) - Prospective Bride Who Operates Crane (uncredited)
 Shameful Behavior? (1926) - Sally Long
 The Fortune Hunter (1927) - Drygoods Store Owner
 The Missing Link (1927) - Woman at Baggage Area (uncredited)
 Backstage (1927) - Referee
 Old San Francisco (1927) - Big-nosed Woman on the Mile of Hell (uncredited)
 Blondes by Choice (1927) - Miss Perkins
 Flying Luck (1927) - A Passerby
 The Girl from Everywhere (1927) - Minor Role (uncredited)
 The Big Noise (1928) - Matron (uncredited)
 The Godless Girl (1928) - Prison Matron (uncredited)
 Guardians of the Wild (1928) - Henchwoman (uncredited)
 The Barker (1928) - Fortune Teller (uncredited)
 Wolves of the City (1929) - Mother Machin
 The Redeeming Sin (1929)
 The Office Scandal (1929) - Battered Wife (uncredited)
 Barnum Was Right (1929) - Treasure Hotel Guest (uncredited)
 Tonight at Twelve (1929) - Ellen
 The Sap (1929) - Mrs. Sprague
 Party Girl (1930) - Masseuse (uncredited)
 Free and Easy (1930) - Big German Woman (uncredited)
 The Man from Blankley's (1930) - Mrs. Gilwattle
 Back Pay (1930) - Masseuse (uncredited)
 Estrellados (1930) - Actress at Casting Call (uncredited)
 The Big Trail (1930) - Gus's mother-in-law
 Always Goodbye (1931) - Tenant in Hallway (uncredited)
 Side Show (1931) - Dolores - Bearded Lady (uncredited)
 Guests Wanted (1932, Short) - Mrs. Carver
 Riders of the Desert (1932) - Slim's Wife
 Handle with Care (1932) - Hat Customer
 The Monkey's Paw (1933) - Minor Role (uncredited)
 Hallelujah, I'm a Bum (1933) - Ma Sunday
 The Devil's Brother (1933) - Tavern Patron (uncredited)
 Morning Glory (1933) - Miss Waterman (uncredited)
 Roman Scandals (1933) - Lady Slave Bidder (uncredited)
 Kid Millions (1934) - Native Woman (uncredited)
 Every Night at Eight (1935) - Mrs. Snyder
 Disorder in the Court (1936, Short) - Flirting Juror (uncredited)
 The Longest Night (1936) - Scrubwoman Swinging Mop (uncredited)
 Dizzy Doctors (1937, Short) - Lady By Car (uncredited)
 New Faces of 1937 (1937) - Former Beauty Contestant at Audition (uncredited)
 High, Wide and Handsome (1937) - Townswoman (uncredited)
 Tight Shoes (1941) - Wedding Woman (uncredited)
 Some More of Samoa (1941, Short) - The King's Sister (uncredited) (final film role)

References
 
 Los Angeles Times, "Death Claims Louise Carver, Old-Time Star", January 20, 1956, Page 24.

External links

 
 
 Louise Carver (Aveleyman)
 Autograph and rare photo (archived)

1869 births
1956 deaths
19th-century American actresses
American stage actresses
20th-century American actresses
American silent film actresses
American Shakespearean actresses
Actresses from Iowa
Actors from Davenport, Iowa
Burials at Chapel of the Pines Crematory